This is a list of notable events in country music that took place in 2009.

Events
August – After 36 years of using the Billboard Hot Country Songs chart as the basis of its program, American Country Countdown begins using the Mediabase chart.
August 10 – Brooks & Dunn announce that they are disbanding in 2010 after two decades as a duo.
August 25 – Jack Ingram sets Guinness Book of World Records mark for most consecutive radio interviews in 24 hours, having done 215 consecutive interviews for five minutes each.
September 13 – Taylor Swift becomes the first country music artist to win an MTV Music Video award at the 2009 event, winning a Best Female Video for "You Belong with Me". Hip hop artist and producer Kanye West interrupts Swift's acceptance speech, implying that another video should have won instead. This results in a media stir for several days; eventually, West apologizes – first on his blog, and then by personally contacting Swift.
October 15 – Garth Brooks announces that he is emerging from retirement to perform shows in Las Vegas. These concerts will be held approximately fifteen weekends per year until the year 2014. His first set of performances already sells out.

Top hits of the year
The following songs placed within the Top 20 on the Hot Country Songs or Canada Country charts in 2009:

Top new album releases
The following albums placed within the Top 50 on the Top Country Albums charts in 2009:

Other top albums

Deaths
 January 9 – Jon Hager, 67, one half of the Hager Twins, gained fame on Hee Haw.
 February 3 – Tom Brumley, 74, steel guitarist for Buck Owens' Buckaroos, Ricky Nelson, and Desert Rose Band; member Int'l Steel Guitar Hall of Fame and Texas Steel Guitar Hall of Fame; best known for steel guitar work on "Together Again"
 February 7 – Molly Bee, 69, gained fame through appearances on Hometown Jamboree. (complications from a stroke)
 March 2 – Ernest Ashworth, 80, Grand Ole Opry star, best known for his 1963 Number One hit, "Talk Back Tremblin' Lips".
 March 8 – Hank Locklin, 91, Grand Ole Opry star, best known for his 1960 crossover hit, "Please Help Me, I'm Falling".
 March 25 – Dan Seals, 61, singer-songwriter of the 1980s, best known for his 1985 crossover hit, "Bop". (mantle cell lymphoma)
 April 28 – Vern Gosdin, 74, singer-songwriter known as "the Voice." (complications from a stroke)
 June 10 – Barry Beckett, 66, record producer and session musician (natural causes)
 June 24 – Tim Krekel, 58, country music songwriter ("Cry on the Shoulder of the Road") (cancer)
 July 28 – Reverend Ike, 74, Ike made a guest appearance on Hank Williams Jr.'s single "Mind Your Own Business", a Number One country hit in 1986. (complications from a stroke)
 August 13 – Les Paul, 94, recording innovator and electric guitar inventor, both which have seen significant use in country music (complications from pneumonia)
 August 14 – Warren "Gates" Nichols, 65, steel guitarist and co-founding member of the 1990s group Confederate Railroad (pancreatic cancer).
 September 27 – Ruby Wright, 69, daughter of country music legends Kitty Wells and Johnnie Wright and prominent member of her parents' touring act (heart-related illness)

Hall of Fame Inductees

Bluegrass Music Hall of Fame Inductees
Lonesome Pine Fiddlers
The Dillards

Country Music Hall of Fame Inductees
Roy Clark (1933-2018)
Barbara Mandrell (born 1948)
Charlie McCoy (born 1941)

Canadian Country Music Hall of Fame Inductees
Buffy Sainte-Marie
Barry Haugen
John Murphy

Major awards

Grammy Awards
(presented January 31, 2010 in Los Angeles)
 Album of the Year – Fearless by Taylor Swift
Best Female Country Vocal Performance – "White Horse", Taylor Swift
Best Male Country Vocal Performance – "Sweet Thing", Keith Urban
Best Country Performance by a Duo or Group with Vocal – "I Run to You", Lady Antebellum
Best Country Collaboration with Vocals – "I Told You So", Carrie Underwood and Randy Travis
Best Country Instrumental Performance – "Producer's Medley", Steve Wariner
Best Country Song – "White Horse", Taylor Swift and Liz Rose
Best Country Album – Fearless by Taylor Swift
Best Bluegrass Album – The Crow: New Songs for the 5-String Banjo, Steve Martin

Juno Awards
(presented April 18, 2010 in St. John's)
Country Album of the Year – Dance with Me, Johnny Reid

CMT Music Awards
(presented June 16 in Nashville)
Video of the Year – "Love Story", Taylor Swift
Male Video of the Year – "Waitin' on a Woman", Brad Paisley
Female Video of the Year – "Love Story", Taylor Swift
Group Video of the Year – "Every Day", Rascal Flatts
Duo Video of the Year – "All I Want to Do", Sugarland
USA Weekend Breakthrough Video of the Year – "Chicken Fried", Zac Brown Band
Collaborative Video of the Year – "Start a Band", Brad Paisley and Keith Urban
Performance of the Year – "Country Boy", Alan Jackson featuring George Strait, Brad Paisley and Dierks Bentley
Wide Open Country Video of the Year – "All Summer Long", Kid Rock
Video Director of the Year – Trey Fanjoy
Nationwide On Your Side Award – Gloriana

Academy of Country Music
(presented April 18, 2010 in Las Vegas)
Entertainer of the Year – Carrie Underwood
Top Male Vocalist – Brad Paisley
Top Female Vocalist – Miranda Lambert
Top Vocal Group – Lady Antebellum
Top Vocal Duo – Brooks & Dunn
Top New Solo Vocalist – Luke Bryan
Top New Vocal Duo – Joey + Rory
Top New Vocal Group – Gloriana
Top New Artist – Luke Bryan
Album of the Year – Revolution, Miranda Lambert
Single Record of the Year – "Need You Now", Lady Antebellum
Song of the Year – "Need You Now", Lady Antebellum
Video of the Year – "White Liar", Miranda Lambert
Vocal Event of the Year – "Hillbilly Bone", Blake Shelton and Trace Adkins

Americana Music Honors & Awards 
Album of the Year – Written in Chalk (Buddy and Julie Miller)
Artist of the Year – Buddy Miller
Duo/Group of the Year – Buddy and Julie Miller
Song of the Year – "Chalk" (Julie Miller)
Emerging Artist of the Year – Justin Townes Earle
Instrumentalist of the Year – Gurf Morlix
Lifetime Achievement: Songwriting – John Fogerty
Lifetime Achievement: Performance – Asleep at the Wheel
Lifetime Achievement: Instrumentalist – Sam Bush
Lifetime Achievement: Executive – Ken Levitan
Lifetime Achievement: Producer/Engineer – Jim Rooney

American Music Awards 
(presented in Los Angeles on November 22, 2009)
Artist of the Year – Taylor Swift
Favorite Country Female Artist – Taylor Swift
 Favorite Country Male Artist – Keith Urban
Favorite Country Band/Duo/Group – Rascal Flatts
Favorite Country Album – Fearless by Taylor Swift

ARIA Awards 
(presented in Sydney on November 26, 2009)
Best Country Album – I Love This Place (Troy Cassar-Daley)
ARIA Hall of Fame – Kev Carmody
ARIA Hall of Fame – The Dingoes

Canadian Country Music Association
(presented September 13 in Vancouver)
Fans' Choice Award – Johnny Reid
Male Artist of the Year – Johnny Reid
Female Artist of the Year – Crystal Shawanda
Group or Duo of the Year – Doc Walker
Songwriter(s) of the Year – "A Woman Like You", written by Johnny Reid and Brent Maher
Single of the Year – "Brothers", performed by Dean Brody
Album of the Year – Dance with Me, Johnny Reid
Top Selling Album – Fearless, Taylor Swift
Top Selling Canadian Album – Dance with Me, Johnny Reid
CMT Video of the Year – "A Woman Like You", Johnny Reid
Rising Star Award – Tara Oram
Roots Artist or Group of the Year – Corb Lund

Country Music Association
(presented November 11 in Nashville)
Entertainer of the Year – Taylor Swift
Single of the Year – "I Run to You", Lady Antebellum
Song of the Year – "In Color", Jamey Johnson
Vocal Group of the Year – Lady Antebellum
New Artist of the Year – Darius Rucker
Album of the Year – Fearless'', Taylor Swift
Musician of the Year – Mac McAnally
Vocal Duo of the Year – Sugarland
Music Video of the Year – "Love Story", Taylor Swift
Male Vocalist of the Year – Brad Paisley
Female Vocalist of the Year – Taylor Swift
Musical Event of the Year – "Start a Band", Brad Paisley and Keith Urban

See also
 Country Music Association
 Inductees of the Country Music Hall of Fame

References

Country
Country music by year